An interference filter or dichroic filter is an optical filter that reflects one or more spectral bands or lines and transmits others, while maintaining a nearly zero coefficient of absorption for all wavelengths of interest. An interference filter may be high-pass, low-pass, bandpass, or band-rejection.

An interference filter consists of multiple thin layers of dielectric material having different refractive indices. There also may be metallic layers. In its broadest meaning, interference filters comprise also etalons that could be implemented as tunable interference filters. Interference filters are wavelength-selective by virtue of the interference effects that take place between the incident and reflected waves at the thin-film boundaries. The important characteristic of the filter is the form of the leaving signal. It is considered that the best form is a rectangle.

References

Additional sources

M. Bass, Handbook of Optics (2nd ed.) pp. 42.89-42.90 (1995)

See also
Thin-film interference

Optical filters
Interference